Douglas Heath Rowe (6 July 1909 – 6 May 1978) was an English professional footballer who played as an outside forward for Luton Town, Lincoln City and Southampton in the 1930s.

Football career
Rowe was born in Nottingham and played his early football with the local Sneinton village side before joining Luton Town in March 1932. After a season with Luton in the Football League Third Division South, in which he made 23 appearances with eight goals, Rowe moved to Lincoln City of the Second Division.

After a year with the "Imps", when he was used as understudy to Jack Wilkinson, Rowe had made eleven appearances at outside left scoring five goals.

In August 1934, he moved to the south coast to join Southampton. He played in two of the first three matches of the season, scoring in his second match, a 2–2 draw with Oldham Athletic, before he lost his place to Laurie Fishlock. Before long, Rowe requested a transfer and he moved to France to join US Tourcoing.

His time in France was brief, and by the following summer he had returned to England.

Family and career outside football
His brother, Bernard was a wrestler, who competed in the 1924 and 1928 Summer Olympics and won a silver medal at the 1934 Empire Games.

Doug himself was a top-class wrestler, winning the England Amateur Welterweight Championship, and also won prizes as a weight-lifter.

References

External links
Career details on www.11v11.com

1909 births
1978 deaths
Footballers from Nottingham
English footballers
Luton Town F.C. players
Lincoln City F.C. players
Southampton F.C. players
English Football League players
Association football forwards